KapStone Paper & Packaging (formerly Stone Arcade Acquisition Corporation) is an American pulp and paper company based in Northbrook, Illinois.  It was founded in 2005 as Stone.  Since November 2018 it has been a subsidiary of WestRock Company.

History
Stone Arcade Acquisition Corporation, a special-purpose acquisition company, was started in 2005, and became an ongoing business concern when it completed its first acquisition—of International Paper—in 2007.  By 2010, the firm was ranked 5th in Fortune Magazine's list of 100 Fastest-Growing Companies. In 2011 it made the list again, ranked 20th fastest-growing. In October 2011, KapStone was ranked #10 on Forbes list on 100 Best Small Companies.

On August 27, 2015, members of the Association of Western Pulp and Paper Workers at KapStone's Longview paper mill went on strike for 10 days over stalled contract negotiations.

Acquisitions

The firm acquired the Roanoke Rapids kraft paper mill from International Paper in January 2007.  In July 2008, it acquired the Charleston kraft paper mill from MeadWestvaco.

On October 31, 2011, KapStone acquired U.S.Corrugated, Inc. It was started in 2006 by Dennis Mehiel, and primarily produces corrugated industrial packaging, with manufacturing facilities in seven states.

KapStone acquired Longview Fibre Paper and Packaging from Brookfield Asset Management on July 18, 2013 . Two years later, on June 1, 2015, it acquired Victory Packaging, headquartered in Houston, Texas.

On November 2, 2018, KapStone itself was acquired by rival pulp and paper company, WestRock Company.

Locations and subsidiaries
The company has kraft paper manufacturing facilities in Roanoke Rapids, North Carolina; Cowpens, South Carolina; North Charleston, South Carolina; and Longview, Washington.  Other assets include a lumber mill in Summerville, South Carolina, 21 corrugated box and corrugated fiberboard plants, and 65 packaging distribution centers.  It has approximately 6,200 employees.

There are several subsidiaries operating in specific fields or in specific countries: KapStone Kraft Paper Corporation, KapStone Charleston Kraft LLC, KapStone Container Corporation, KapStone Europe SPRL, KapStone Asia Limited.

Products
KapStone produces sack paper, containerboard, saturating Kraft products, Corrugated fiberboard sheets and boxes, and construction lumber. The company's paper brands include Kraftpak, DuraSorb, TEA-Kraft, FibreLok, FibreShield, and FibreGreen.

References

External links
 WestRock Company website

American companies established in 2005
Companies formerly listed on the New York Stock Exchange
Companies based in Northbrook, Illinois
Manufacturing companies based in Illinois
Manufacturing companies established in 2005
Pulp and paper companies of the United States
2005 initial public offerings
2018 mergers and acquisitions
Special-purpose acquisition companies